Total Entertainment Network (TEN) was an online gaming service that existed from September 1996 until October 1999. T E Network, Inc., which created and operated the TEN service, was formed from the merger of Optigon Interactive and Outland in June 1995 when they received their first round of venture capital funding from Vinod Khosla, a general partner at Kleiner Perkins Caufield & Byers.

History
Total Entertainment Network was the first online gaming provider to go live. Operating out of San Francisco, the service offered PC game players a place to play DOS and Windows-based games online with and against other players, to chat, to download game-related content, and to compete for high scores and to win tournaments. The service was bundled with many PC games and offered as a subscription service. The games supported on TEN include Duke Nukem 3D, NASCAR Racing Online Series, Quake, Command & Conquer, Panzer General, and Big Red Racing.

Many online games, especially PC games adapted for online game play, require low and consistent latency to play well. It was a major challenge circa 1996 for consumers to find consistent low-latency connections to central servers or to other game players because of the latency intrinsic to dial-up modems and the heavy congestion at the Internet peering points. T E Network, Inc. partnered with Concentric Network Corporation to offer consumers Internet access dial-up numbers that would provide the reliable low latencies they needed to play online games. Concentric optimized their network and their dial-up technology for the TEN service. Concentric also received venture capital financing from Kleiner Perkins Caufield & Byers.

Even with the combined revenues of subscriptions and advertising, TEN remained unprofitable, failing to reach the critical mass numbers of subscribers needed to cover their costs. After the success of Blizzard Entertainment's free Battle.net service for Diablo and their claim that offering online play as a feature of the game boosted retail sales by 10%, PC game publishers started following Blizzard's lead and offering free online game play. This undermined the subscription business model of TEN and their strategy to be the exclusive place to play popular PC games online. As Internet advertising was starting to gain traction, T E Network decided to focus on easy-to-access and easy-to-play browser-based games that would appeal to a broad audience and attract enough unique users to drive an advertising-based business model. T E Network, Inc. became Pogo.com, Inc. to pursue this new strategy.

TEN games 
 AD&D's Dark Sun Online
 Attack Retrieve Capture (ARC)
 Big Red Racing
 Blood
 Command & Conquer
 Command & Conquer: Red Alert
 Dark Sun Online: Crimson Sands
 Deadlock: Planetary Conquest
 Diablo
 Duke Nukem 3D and add-ons
 EF2000
 Magic: The Gathering Online
 Master of Orion II
 Myth
 NASCAR Racing Online Series
 Necrodome
 Panzer General
 Quake
 Quake 2
 Shadow Warrior
 Total Annihilation
 Twilight Lands
 WarCraft
 Warheads
 Wiz-War
 Wulfram

Earlier Total Entertainment Network service from Optigon Interactive 

The first Total Entertainment Network (TEN) service was an online gaming network and community portal developed by Optigon Interactive. Optigon Interactive was founded by Daniel Goldman and Janice Linden-Reed in 1991 and launched a beta nationally in 1994 via Sprint's X.25 dial-up network. The brand was developed in conjunction with Alan Buder, from Colossal Picture, and Michael Lipscomb. It was an online service with a DOS client that offered Chess, Checkers, SimCity, email, and chat[1].  The entire executive management team Optigon went on to become the executive management team for TE Network, joined by CTO David King from Outland.

In 1996 TEN hosted a first of its kind, nationally participated in "online tournament" rewarding the champions with cash and prizes sparking an immediate surge in online gaming. Some of the first prizes were $500 cash and a lifetime membership to the service. The only Duke tournament was won by one of the first cyber athletes, Christopher S Carpentier, aka "Creamator", who battled over 14 thousand entries to claim the title of “One True Duke!”  Most of these newly declared cyber athletes later went on to the PGL "Professional Gamers League" after TEN converted its business model to Pogo. Organizations like the PGL enhanced the awards, and in 1997 Dennis Fong, also known as Thresh, a professional gamer, won John Carmack's Ferrari at the Red Annihilation tournament. During his career as a professional gamer, it is believed that he made over US$100,000 in endorsements alone.

Closure 

The Total Entertainment Network was shutdown in October 1999 due to the rapid development of online gaming services during the time. From the closure, TEN transformed into Pogo.com and then was acquired by Electronic Arts in 2001. The Total Entertainment Network website in 1997 can still be explored and viewed at http://ten.net.

See also 
Pogo.com

References

External links 
 Archived TEN website as it appeared in 1997

Online video game services
Defunct video game companies of the United States
Defunct websites
Internet properties disestablished in 1999